The Mindanao scops owl (Otus mirus) is an owl endemic to Mindanao island in the Philippines.

References
Notes

Sources
BirdLife Species Factsheet - Mindanao Scops-owl
 Owl pages

Mindanao scops owl
Birds of Mindanao
Mindanao scops owl